The Olympic Park Neighborhood Council (OPNC) represents 22,000 constituents in the Olympic Park neighborhood of Los Angeles. It runs from the east side of La Brea Avenue to the west side of Normandie Avenue, and from the south side of Olympic Boulevard to the north side of Pico Boulevard. In 2012, the OPNC was involved in the median redevelopment project on San Vicente Boulevard, from Fairfax Avenue to Pico Boulevard. 
As of January 2020, the OPNC had 6 West At-Large Representatives, 5 East At-Large Representatives, and 1 Youth Representative. The board has 6 vacant seats and a $42,000 annual budget.

The board as of January 2022 is as follows:

Mitchell Edelson, President

Najmah Brown, Vice President

Guiliana Dakdouk, Secretary

Milton Gaines, Treasurer

West At Large Representatives: Kyle Cadman, Sean Cunningham, Nathan Freedman, Michael Hagerty, Charles Jang, Ricky Yapkowitz

East At Large Representatives: Ramsay Goyal, Elisha Hall, Sheila Hill, Eddie Robinson, Guy Toley

Student Representative: Asha Goyal

References

Organizations based in Los Angeles

External links 
 Olympic Park Neighborhood Council Website.